Pirate Cove, Pirates Cove, Pirate's Cove, Pirates' Cove, or variation, may refer to:

 a cove used as a base by pirates

Places

United States
 Pirates Cove, a bay and a clothing-optional beach in San Luis Obispo County, California
 Pirates Cove, Florida, an unincorporated community on Sugarloaf Key
 Pirates Cove Waterpark, a water park in Arapahoe County, Colorado
 Pirate's Cove Waterpark at Pohick Bay, in Virginia
 Pirate Cove, an area developed as a fish station on Popof Island, Alaska

Elsewhere
 Pirates Cove Marine Provincial Park, British Columbia, Canada
 Pirates' Cove, a zone at Chessington World of Adventures amusement park in London, England, UK

Games
 Tropico 2: Pirate Cove, a 2003 video game
 Pirate Cove (video game), a 1978 video game
 Pirate's Cove, a 2002 board game

See also
 Pirates of Black Cove, a 2011 RTS game
 Pirate (disambiguation)
 Cove (disambiguation)